Racinoa ochraceipennis is a moth in the family Bombycidae. It was described by Embrik Strand in 1910. It is found in Malawi.

References

Bombycidae
Moths described in 1910